"Victory" is a song by American musician Ross Mintzer, released as a single 2013. "Victory" was recorded by the Ross Mintzer Band.

Personnel 
Ross Mintzer - vocals, acoustic guitar
Evan Shinners - piano
Geoff Kraly- bass
Joe Saylor - drums
Kevin Ryan - harmonica
Strait Gate Judah Choral

External links
 Full lyrics to this song at MTV Italy

References

2005 songs
2005 singles